Agentura. Ru (Russian: Агентура.Ру) is a Russian web-site founded in 2000 as an online community of journalists who cover terrorism, and intelligence agencies. From 2000 to 2006 the web-site was supported by ISP Relcom and since 2006 Agentura.Ru has been a voluntary project.

Agentura. Ru is considered a respected source on Russia's secret services. Its editor is Andrei Soldatov and deputy editor Irina Borogan.

Agentura.Ru has been quoted by The New York Times, The Moscow Times, The Washington Post, Online Journalism Review, Le Monde, The Christian Science Monitor, CNN, Federation of American Scientists, the BBC and the websites of The Centre for Counterintelligence and Security Studies, Center for Defense Information, the Library of Congress, Cambridge Security Programme. The New York Times dubbed Agentura.Ru 'a website that came in from the cold to unveil Russian secrets'.

The Committee to Protect Journalists (CPJ) in its report 2004-03  "Attacks on the Press 2003" quoted Agentura. Ru: "While some Russian newspapers like the Moscow-based twice-weekly Novaya Gazeta have developed a strong tradition of exposing government abuses and continue to do so, others have been dissuaded after seeing colleagues murdered, beaten, prosecuted, and fined. Journalists who have opted for publishing on the Internet - like Andrei Soldatov, who runs the Web site Agentura.ru and specializes in writing about Russia's powerful security services-have been detained and questioned by security forces angered by articles about their activities".

In September 2005 Agentura.Ru published the research paper “Terrorism prevention in Russia: one year after Beslan” (English). A short version of it appeared in the Royal United Services Institute/Jane's Homeland Security and Resilience Monitor. In June 2006 Agentura.Ru Studies and Research Centre prepared the report "The role of Al-Qaeda in the North Caucasus]", first published in Novaya Gazeta.

Between January 2006 and late 2008, Agentura.Ru cooperated with Novaya Gazeta in covering intelligence and terrorism issues.

In June 2008 The Moscow Times published and article about Agentura.Ru "Journalist Enjoying A Security Monopoly": "Agentura.ru has developed into an information and analytical hub, updated on a daily basis and covering developments related to security services in Russia and the former Soviet Union and terrorist groups worldwide. It also publishes articles on the history and practices of foreign security agencies and issues like media and legislative oversight of security services".

On November 12, 2008, Andrei Soldatov’s employer Novaya Gazeta fired him and ceased its collaboration with Agentura.ru.

References

External links

Russian news websites
Think tanks based in Russia
Security studies
2000 establishments in Russia
Russian-language websites